Baisha is a town of Zhongmu County, Henan, China. , it has 16 villages under its administration.

References

Township-level divisions of Henan
Zhongmu County